Svitlana Volodymyrivna Shmidt (born 20 March 1990) is a Ukrainian runner who specializes in the middle distance events.

Doping ban 
In April 2015 Shmidt was banned from sport for four years after IAAF found abnormal deviations in her biological passport profile. Her results from 8 March 2012 onwards were disqualified.

Achievements

References

1990 births
Living people
Ukrainian female middle-distance runners
Ukrainian female steeplechase runners
Olympic athletes of Ukraine
Athletes (track and field) at the 2012 Summer Olympics
European Athletics Championships medalists
Doping cases in athletics
Ukrainian sportspeople in doping cases
Sportspeople from Mariupol
20th-century Ukrainian women
21st-century Ukrainian women